Batra is an Indian Hindu and Sikh clan of the Arora Khatri community of Punjab.

Notable people

Armed Forces 

Vikram Batra, PVC (1974–1999), officer of the Indian Army, posthumously awarded India's highest award for valour

Athletics 

 Manika Batra, Indian table tennis player, Commonwealth Games gold medalist

Bollywood 

 Pooja Batra (born 1976), Indian actress who was Miss India International in 1993
 Ritesh Batra (born 1979) film director
 Sanjay Batra, television actor in India
 Shakun Batra, Indian film director. He directed Ek Main Aur Ekk Tu , Kapoor & Sons and Gehraiyaan

Creatives 

 Adrienne Batra, Indian-Canadian journalist and editor-in-chief of the Toronto Sun
 Aseem Batra, producer and writer of Scrubs
 David Batra (born 1972), Swedish-Indian stand-up comedian and TV actor
 Hemant Batra, Indian origin lawyer, public speaker and author
Vibha Batra, Indian author, advertising consultant, poet, lyricist, translator, travel writer, playwright, and columnist

Politics 

 Anna Kinberg Batra (born 1970), Swedish politician, leader of the Moderate Party 2015-
 Bharat Bhushan Batra, Indian politician serving as the MLA of Rohtak
 Dinanath Batra, former general secretary of Vidya Bharati, the school network run by the RSS
 Pradip Batra, Indian BJP politician and member of the Uttarakhand Legislative Assembly from the Roorkee constituency
 Shadi Lal Batra, Indian politician

Religious Leaders 

 Balak Singh Batra, Sikh religious leader who founded Namdhari (Kuka) sect

Science and engineering 

 Anuj Batra, research electrical engineer specializing in ultrawideband wireless technology. He was included in Innovators Under 35 "TR35" list
 Harsh Vardhan Batra, Indian scientist working in animal biotechnology in Indian Ministry of Science and Technology
 Lekh Raj Batra, (1929–1999), distinguished Indian-American mycologist
 Mukesh Batra, homeopathy practitioner, and Founder of Dr. Batra's Health Clinic Pvt Ltd.
Ravi Batra (born 1943), Indian-American economist, author, and professor at Southern Methodist University
Romesh Batra, professor in the Department of Engineering Science and Mechanics at Virginia Tech
Siddharth Batra, computer scientist, entrepreneur and researcher in artificial intelligence. co-founder of X1 Card that has been dubbed "the smartest credit card ever made.".

References

Surnames of Indian origin
Punjabi tribes
Indian surnames
Arora clans
Punjabi-language surnames
Khatri clans
Khatri surnames
Hindu surnames